20,000 (twenty thousand) is the natural number that comes after 19,999 and before 20,001.

20,000 is a round number, and is also in the title of Jules Verne's novel Twenty Thousand Leagues Under the Sea.

Selected numbers in the range 20001–29999

20001 to 20999
 20002 = number of surface-points of a tetrahedron with edge-length 100
 20081 = Motorola 68K instruction for no operation (NOP)
 20100 = sum of the first 200 natural numbers (hence a triangular number)
 20160 = highly composite number; the smallest order belonging to two non-isomorphic simple groups: the alternating group A8 and the Chevalley group A2(4)
 20161 = the largest integer that cannot be expressed as a sum of two abundant numbers
 20230 = pentagonal pyramidal number
 20412 = Leyland number: 93 + 39
 20540 = square pyramidal number
 20569 = tetranacci number
 20593 = unique prime in base 12
 20597 = k such that the sum of the squares of the first k primes is divisible by k.
 20736 = 1442 = 124, 1000012, palindromic in base 15 (622615)
 20793 = little Schroeder number
 20871 = The number of weeks in exactly 400 years in the Gregorian calendar
 20903 = first prime of form 120k + 23 that is not a full reptend prime

21000 to 21999
 21025 = 1452, palindromic in base 12 (1020112)
 21147 = Bell number
 21181 = the least of five remaining Seventeen or Bust numbers in the Sierpiński problem
 21856 = octahedral number
 21943 = Friedman prime
 21952 = 283
 21978 = reverses when multiplied by 4: 4 × 21978 = 87912

22000 to 22999
 22050 = pentagonal pyramidal number
 22140 = square pyramidal number
 22222 = repdigit, Kaprekar number: 222222 = 493817284, 4938 + 17284 = 22222
 22447 = cuban prime
 22527 = Woodall number: 11 × 211 − 1
 22621 = repunit prime in base 12
 22699 = one of five remaining Seventeen or Bust numbers in the Sierpiński problem

23000 to 23999
 23000 = number of primes .
 23401 = Leyland number: 65 + 56
 23409 = 1532, sum of the cubes of the first 17 positive integers
 23497 = cuban prime
 23821 = square pyramidal number
 23833 = Padovan prime
 23969 = octahedral number
 23976 = pentagonal pyramidal number

24000 to 24999
 24211 = Zeisel number
 24336 = 1562, palindromic in base 5: 12343215
 24389 = 293
 24571 = cuban prime
 24601 – Jean Valjean's prisoner number in Les Misérables
 24631 = Wedderburn–Etherington prime
 24649 = 1572, palindromic in base 12: 1232112
 24737 = one of five remaining Seventeen or Bust numbers in the Sierpinski problem

25000 to 25999
 25011 = the smallest composite number, ending in 1, 3, 7, or 9, that in base 10 remains composite after any insertion of a digit
 25085 = Zeisel number
 25117 = cuban prime
 25200 = highly composite number
 25205 = largest number whose factorial is less than 10100000
 25585 = square pyramidal number
 25724 = Fine number

26000 to 26999
 26214 = octahedral number
 26227 = cuban prime
 26861 = smallest number for which there are more primes of the form 4k + 1 than of the form 4k + 3 up to the number, against Chebyshev's bias
 26896 = 1642, palindromic in base 9: 408049

27000 to 27999
 27000 = 303
 27434 = square pyramidal number
 27559 = Zeisel number
 27648 = 11 × 22 × 33 × 44
 27653 = Friedman prime
 27720 = highly composite number; smallest number divisible by the numbers 1 to 12 (there is no smaller number divisible by the numbers 1 to 11 since any number divisible by 4 and 3 must be divisible by 12, since 4×3=12)
 27846 = harmonic divisor number
 27889 = 1672

28000 to 28999
 28158 = pentagonal pyramidal number
 28374 = smallest integer to start a run of six consecutive integers with the same number of divisors
 28393 = unique prime in base 13
 28547 = Friedman prime
 28559 = nice Friedman prime
 28561 = 1692 = 134 = 1192 + 1202, number that is simultaneously a square number and a centered square number, palindromic in base 12: 1464112
 28595 = octahedral number
 28657 = Fibonacci prime, Markov prime
 28900 = 1702, palindromic in base 13: 1020113

29000 to 29999
 29241 = 1712, sum of the cubes of the first 18 positive integers
 29341 = Carmichael number
 29370 = square pyramidal number
 29527 = Friedman prime
 29531 = Friedman prime
 29601 = number of planar partitions of 18
 29791 = 313

There are 983 prime numbers between 20000 and 30000.

References

20000